Healy Trough is a primary elongate trough in the Labyrinth of Wright Valley, McMurdo Dry Valleys, extending diagonally SW-NE across the east part of the feature. Named by Advisory Committee on Antarctic Names (US-ACAN) (2004) after Terry R. Healy, Department of Earth Sciences, University of Waikato, Hamilton, New Zealand, who, with John Shaw, published observations on the formation of the Labyrinth following a visit in the 1975–76 season.

Valleys of Victoria Land
McMurdo Dry Valleys